Kirillo-Karmasan (Kirill-Qarmasan) is a rural locality (a village) in Blagovarsky Selsoviet, Blagovarsky District, Bashkortostan, Russia. The population was 2 as of 2010. There is 1 street.

Geography 
Kirillo-Karmasan is located 12 km southwest of Yazykovo (the district's administrative centre) by road. Samarino is the nearest rural locality.

References 

Rural localities in Blagovarsky District